Dollis Hill is a London Underground station at Dollis Hill near to Willesden and Gladstone Park of the London Borough of Brent. It is on the Jubilee line, between Neasden and Willesden Green stations and is in Travelcard Zone 3. Metropolitan line trains pass through the station without stopping here.

The station has no surface buildings.

History

The station opened on 1 October 1909 as part of the Metropolitan line. From 20 November 1939 it was on the Stanmore branch of the Bakerloo line and was transferred to the Jubilee line in 1979. It has two exits.

In 1995 four sets of enamel panels designed by Amanda Duncan were installed in the subway between the north and south exits. The panels show maps of the Dollis Hill area at different dates from the 16th to the 20th century, juxtaposed with interpretations of classical star maps.

The station was refurbished in 2007 with the addition of new lighting, tiling and additional security cameras. The station was also repainted.

Services and connections
Train frequencies vary throughout the day but generally operate every 3–6 minutes between 05:56 and 00:30 in both directions.

London Bus routes 6, 52, 98, 226, 260, 266, 297, 302 and 460, and night route N98 serve the station. Furthermore, routes 6, 52, 266 and 297 are 24-hour services.

Trivia
Dollis Hill was frequently mentioned in the humorous game Mornington Crescent, featured on the radio comedy show I'm Sorry I Haven't A Clue. Traditionally, the playing of Dollis Hill starts a "Dollis Hill Loop", meaning that every subsequent move made by any player must be to Dollis Hill. Various ingenious ways to break the loop have been invented by Mornington Crescent players in the past.

References

Jubilee line stations
London Underground Night Tube stations
Tube stations in the London Borough of Brent
Former Metropolitan Railway stations
Railway stations in Great Britain opened in 1909
Railway stations with vitreous enamel panels